Allen was mayor of Newton, Iowa between 2004 and 2012. Allen stated in July 2018 that he would not run for election and that he was resigning from public office.

Electoral history

References

External links 
Legislator website

Democratic Party Iowa state senators
Living people
1970 births
21st-century American politicians
Mayors of places in Iowa
People from East Point, Georgia